Danbulla National Park and State Forest is a national park and state forest complex in Queensland, Australia, around 60 km west of Cairns.

The forest is spectacular and covers an area of 12,000 hectares, including eucalyptus, acacia and pine plantations.

The elevation of the terrain is 737 meters.

References

See also

 Protected areas of Queensland

National parks of Far North Queensland